Kadiri Ikhana (born 31 December 1951) is a Nigerian football coach and former player who last managed Kano Pillars.

Playing career
Ikhana played club football with Bendel Insurance, winning the league in 1979 and the FA Cup in 1978 and 1980.

Ikhana represented Nigeria at international level, playing for them in FIFA World Cup qualifying matches at the 1980 Summer Olympic Games. He won the 1980 African Cup of Nations with Nigeria.

Coaching career
Ikhana has coached a number of Nigerian club sides, including El-Kanemi Warriors, BCC Lions, Kwara United, Sunshine Stars, Sharks and Giwa.

Ikhana managed Nigeria's Enyimba, winning the African Champions League in 2003. He was awarded CAF's Coach of the Year that same year. In 2004, he was manager of the Nigerian men's Olympic team.

He later managed Kano Pillars, before resigning in May 2008, citing corruption in the sport. He had led Kano Pillars to their first ever league title a day earlier.

He was appointed manager of the Nigerian women's national team in April 2012, before resigning in November 2012.

He was managing Nasarawa United in November 2013 when he decided to retire from the sport. He returned to Enyimba, winning another league title, before moving to Shooting Stars in February 2016. He returned to Kano Pillars in November 2016, before being sacked in April 2017.

Honours

As a player
With Bendel Insurance
Nigerian Premier League – 1979
Nigerian FA Cup – 1978, 1980

With Nigeria
African Cup of Nations – 1980

As a coach
With Enyimna
Nigerian Premier League – 2015
CAF Champions League – 2003

With Kano Pillars
Nigerian Premier League – 2008

Individual
CAF Coach of the Year – 2003

References

1951 births
Living people
Association football midfielders
Nigerian footballers
Bendel Insurance F.C. players
Nigeria international footballers
Africa Cup of Nations-winning players
1978 African Cup of Nations players
1980 African Cup of Nations players
Olympic footballers of Nigeria
Footballers at the 1980 Summer Olympics
Nigerian football managers
El-Kanemi Warriors F.C. managers
BCC Lions F.C. managers
Kwara United F.C. managers
Sunshine Stars F.C. managers
Sharks F.C. managers
Giwa F.C. managers
Enyimba F.C. managers
Kano Pillars F.C. managers
Nasarawa United F.C. managers
Shooting Stars S.C. managers
Nigeria women's national football team managers
People from Ilorin